Paul Vittet (26 November 1932 – 22 October 1998) was a Swiss sports shooter. He competed at the 1968 Summer Olympics and the 1972 Summer Olympics.

References

External links
 

1932 births
1998 deaths
Swiss male sport shooters
Olympic shooters of Switzerland
Shooters at the 1968 Summer Olympics
Shooters at the 1972 Summer Olympics
Sportspeople from Geneva